Alyssa is Alyssa Milano's self-titled second studio album and major-label debut, released October 25, 1989.  On this album she worked with most of the same producers she had worked with on the first album. The album was also released as a Picture Disc Edition.

Track listing
"I Just Wanna Be Loved" (Joey Carbone, Dennis Belfield) - 3:25
"I Had a Dream" (Joey Carbone, Dennis Belfield) - 3:45
"Step by Step" (Joey Carbone, Dennis Belfield) - 4:57
"Can You Feel It" (Joey Carbone, Tom Milano) - 4:37
"Destiny" (Joey Carbone) - 4:48
"Happiness" (Joey Carbone, Tom Milano, Mark Davis) - 3:41
"Give a Little Kindness" (Joey Carbone, Tom Milano) - 3:50
"Be My Baby/Tell Me That You Love Me - Medley" (Jeff Barry, Phil Spector, Ellie Greenich /Joey Carbone, Tom Milano) - 4:36
"Let My Love Show You" (Tom Milano, Gary Mallaber) - 3:39
"We Need the Children" (Alyssa Milano, Joey Carbone, Tom Milano) - 5:08

Singles

Album credits

Personnel
 Bill Purse, Joey Carbone, Tom Milano, Mark Davis, John D'Andrea – Synthesizers
 John Goux, Teddy Castelluci – Guitar
 Alyssa Milano, Beth Andersen, Gail Lennon, Andrea Robinson, Carmen Twillie, Donna Davidson – Background Vocals
 Joel Peskin, David Woodford – Sax
 Gary Mallaber – Additional Drums on "We Need The Children"
 St. John Eudes Children's Choir – Choir ("We Need the Children")
 Judith Storey – Choir Director

Production
 Producers: Joey Carbone, Katz Nagasawa, Tom Milano
 Arrangers: Joey Carbone, Tom Milano
 Engineers: Bill Purse (Windom Records), Eddie King (King Sound Studio), John D'Andrea (Midi Gritti Heaven Studio), Mark Davis
 Mixing: Leslie Ann Jones (Capitol Recording Studios)
 Drum & Synthesizer programming: Bill Purse, John D'Andrea, Tom Milano, Mark Davis
 Executive Producers: Harry Kaneko for Pony Canyon INC. and Sammy Masada for Marubeni Corporation
 Pony Canyon Producer: Masa Shigeno
Management: Sam Kazama and Michael O'Connor
Agency: Ford Models Japan

Design
Styling: Beth Bickson & Lauren Ehrenfeld
Photography: Michael O’Connor
Hair & Makeup: Kenneth Gonzales & Johnny Hernandez
Wall Paintings: Geof Millar

Chart performance

References

Alyssa Milano albums
1989 albums
Pony Canyon albums